Microdata can mean:

 Microdata (statistics), a statistical term for individual response data in surveys and censuses
 Microdata (HTML), a specification for semantic markup in HTML 
 Microdata Corporation, a California-based computer company